The Spencer Presbyterian Church, also known locally as the Market Street Chapel, is a historic church building at 408 Market Street in Spencer, West Virginia.  It is a single-story T-shaped brick building, with a cross-gabled roof.  The gable ends are adorned with large Gothic windows, and there is a square tower at the crook of the T, housing the main entrance and rising to an octagonal belfry and cross-topped octagonal roof.  It was built in 1903, and is prominent as an example of brick construction when most churches in the area were wooden.  It is also a significant local example of Late Victorian Gothic architecture.

It was listed on the National Register of Historic Places in 1999.

See also
National Register of Historic Places in Roane County, West Virginia

References

Churches on the National Register of Historic Places in West Virginia
Churches completed in 1925
Buildings and structures in Roane County, West Virginia
National Register of Historic Places in Roane County, West Virginia